Lachezar Dafkov (born 12 June 1973) is a Bulgarian footballer currently playing for Malesh Mikrevo as a defender.

References

Bulgarian footballers
1973 births
Living people
OFC Pirin Blagoevgrad players
FC Malesh Mikrevo players
First Professional Football League (Bulgaria) players
Place of birth missing (living people)
Association football midfielders